Michael or Mike Wheeler may refer to:
 Michael A. Wheeler (born 1943), teacher at Harvard Business School
 Michael Wheeler (athlete) (1935–2020), British sprinter
 Michael Brian Wheeler, United States Army Reserve officer, charged with fraud 
 Michael Mortimer Wheeler (1915–1992), British lawyer
 Michael Wheeler-Booth (1934–2018), UK civil servant in the House of Lords
 Michael Wheeler (philosopher) (born 1960), British philosopher
 Mike Wheeler (NASCAR) (born 1978), American racing crew chief
 Mike Wheeler (musician) (born 1961), American blues songwriter and guitarist
 Mike Wheeler (Stranger Things), a fictional character